Oad or OAD may refer to:

Science and technology 
 Auditory processing disorder or obscure auditory dysfunction (OAD), an auditory condition
 Object-oriented analysis and design, a software engineering approach
 Open Access Directory, founded by Peter Suber and Robin Peek
 Original Acquisition Disk, in digital forensics

Other uses 
 Original animation DVD, an anime release bundled with its source-material manga
 Oad (caste), a social group of South Asia
 Oad language, an Indo-Aryan language
 Oad Street, a hamlet in Kent, England
 Oad Swigart (1915–1997), American baseball player
 Ordo Augustiniensium Discalceatorum, a Catholic religious order
 Oxford American Dictionary